Torrisdale Bay may refer to:

Torrisdale Bay, Argyll
Torrisdale Bay, Highland